Kageneckia angustifolia (also known as frangel) is a species of plant in the family Rosaceae. It is endemic to Chile.  It grows from Limari to Talca (30 to 35°S) in the Chilean Coast Range and in the Andes.

Description
It is an evergreen small tree or shrub that measures up to 5 m (16 ft) tall, the bark is greyish-brown and sheds in longitudinal strips. Leaves are alternate, very leathery, with toothed edge and linear shape, the leaves are petiolate, glossy light-green about 9 cm long. The flowers are unisexual  star-shaped and white, solitary or clustered in axillary inflorescences. The calyx is formed by 5 sepals, the corolla is made up by 5 petals. The male ones have 15 stamens. The fruit is a pentamerous star-shaped capsule, about 2–3 cm in diameter. The seeds are winged.

Uses
The wood is used for elaborating coal.

Etymology
Kageneckia in honour of Frederick von Kageneck, Austrian ambassador to Madrid.

External links

angustifolia
Endemic flora of Chile
Trees of Chile